Greg Holmes (born 11 June 1983 in Warwick, Queensland) is an Australian rugby union footballer. He currently plays for the Western Force in Super Rugby AU and  plays for Australia. His usual position is at   tighthead prop, however he can play on either side of the scrum.

Career
Holmes made his Super 12 debut for the Reds in 2005 playing the Auckland Blues in Auckland. After having a strong debut season, Holmes found himself getting a callup to the Wallabies squad to tour Europe. He made his Australian debut against France in Marseille. Holmes came off the bench in Australia's loss to England at Twickenham, where the English overpowered the Wallabies with their scrummaging. He was included in John Connolly's Wallabies side to face England at Telstra Stadium. In the return match against the English, Australia won 34 to 3. In 2006, Holmes scored a remarkable try against the Irish, running over 60 metres to touch down. He also scored in Australia's 49-0 victory over South Africa, this time scoring a try more akin to a prop by smashing through three South African would-be tacklers. In 2011, Holmes was included in Wallabies squad.

Holmes announced on 21 December 2015 that he would be calling time on his Wallabies career and joining Aviva Premiership side Exeter Chiefs for the 2016/17 season on a two-year deal.

He later signed for the Western Force ahead of the 2020 Super Rugby AU season before being recalled to the national squad for a Test against Argentina in the 2021 Rugby Championship at the age of 38, making him the oldest Wallaby to make the side since World War II.

References

External links
Queensland profile
Wallabies profile
itsrugby.co.uk profile

1983 births
Australian rugby union players
Australia international rugby union players
Queensland Reds players
Rugby union props
Living people
Queensland Country (NRC team) players
Exeter Chiefs players
Australian expatriate rugby union players
Australian expatriate sportspeople in England
Expatriate rugby union players in England
Western Force players
Rugby union players from Queensland